Callitris drummondii, or Drummond's cypress, is a species of conifer in the family Cupressaceae. It is found only in Western Australia. It is threatened by habitat loss.

References

drummondii
Pinales of Australia
Vulnerable flora of Australia
Endemic flora of Southwest Australia
Taxonomy articles created by Polbot